Md Moshfequr Rahman is a retired Major General of Bangladesh Army who served as the Adjutant General at Army Headquarter. Prior to join AG Branch, He was Vice Chancellor of Bangladesh University of Professional. He was the Vice Chairman of Trust Bank Limited and Astha Life Insurance Company Limited.

Education 
Rahman has three masters from the Bangladesh University of Professionals, the National University, Bangladesh, and the University of Madras respectively.

Career 
Rahman had served as an instructor in the School of Infantry and Tactics, National Defence College, and Defence Services Command and Staff College. He had also been the Commandant of the Bangladesh Infantry Regimental Center.

Rahman had served as the General officer commanding of the 11th infantry division. In 2017, he reviewed Sampriti joint military exercise between Bangladesh and India. Bangladesh Army's 38th East Bengal Regiment and IV Corps of India participated in the exercise held in Counter-Insurgency and Jungle Warfare School, Mizoram. He had also been the Director General of the Directorate General of Defence Purchase.

Rahman had served as the Logistics Area Commander in 2020. He was also the Chief Patron of the Dhaka Cantonment Girls' Public School and College. He oversaw Siraj-Khaleda Memorial Cantonment Board General Hospital and received ambulances from Summit Group for the hospital. On 28 December 2020, Rahman was appointed the Vice-Chancellor of Bangladesh University of Professionals. He is a member of the governing body of the National Defence College. He was the President of Army Golf Club. He was also the Chairperson of Bangladesh Golf Academy.

References 

Living people
Bangladesh Army generals
Year of birth missing (living people)
Vice-Chancellors of Bangladesh University of Professionals
Bangladesh University of Professionals alumni
University of Madras alumni